St. Nicholas Fortress is a fortress located at the entrance to St. Anthony Channel, near the town of Šibenik in central Dalmatia, Croatia.

It was included in UNESCO's World Heritage Site list as part of "Venetian Works of Defence between 16th and 17th centuries: Stato da Terra – western Stato da mar" in 2017.

After reconstruction work that lasted for two years, the fortress was open to visitors in July 2019.

History

The town of Šibenik has a fortification system consisting of four fortresses:
 St. Nicholas Fortress
 St. Michael's Fortress
 St. John's Fortress
 Barone Fortress
Only St. Nicholas Fortress is at sea, at the entrance to the Šibenik port, and the remaining three are on land.

St. Nicholas Fortress was built on the left side at the entrance to St. Anthony Channel, on the island called Ljuljevac. The island is situated at the entrance to the Šibenik channel across the Jadrija beach lighthouse. St. Nicholas Fortress got its name from the Benedictine Monastery of St. Nicholas, which was originally on the island, but due to the construction of the fortress, it had to be demolished. At the request of domestic Croat population of Šibenik, the Venetian captain Alvise Canal decided to build a fort on the island of Ljuljevac on 30 April 1525. The fortress was designed and built by the famous Venetian architect and builder Giangirolamo Sanmicheli (nephew of Michele Sanmicheli). It was built by in the 16th century to prevent Turkish boats from reaching the port. St. Nicholas Fortress was armed with 32 cannons. However, its imposing appearance and size were a bigger threat to the enemy than cannons ever were.

Architecture

The fortress is one of the most valuable and best preserved examples of defense architecture in Dalmatia. It is made of brick because that material was considered to be most resistant to cannonballs, while the foundations are made of stone. Although defense capabilities of the fortress have never been tested in military operations, the structure still proved successful in protecting the city from sea-bound enemy attacks. During the centuries of use, the structure served to various armies and has undergone a number of renovations, some of them necessary only because of the development of arms. It was completely abandoned by the military in 1979 and has been undergoing renovation ever since.

Notes
In the Mediterranean, there are two similar forts: one on the island of Malta, and the other is in Venice, named Forte di Sant'Andrea.

Image gallery

References

External links

St. Anthony's channel official website
Explore St Nicholas’ Fortress in the UNESCO collection on Google Arts and Culture

Buildings and structures completed in 1547
Castles in Croatia
Buildings and structures in Šibenik-Knin County
Šibenik
1547 establishments in Europe
Tourist attractions in Šibenik-Knin County
Fortress